Roy Allen Burrell is an American politician. He served as a Democratic member for the 2nd district of the Louisiana House of Representatives.

In 2004, Burrell won the election for the 2nd district of the Louisiana House of Representatives. He succeeded Lydia P. Jackson. In 2014, Burrell had made an appearance to the radio broadcasting station KEEL, in which he mentioned that Burrell would serve as mayor in Shreveport, Louisiana. He withdrew his serving into becoming mayor for which his friend who was a former Democratic mayor in Shreveport, Louisiana and businessman Keith Hightower had made it unfeasible for him to become mayor. It was that Burrell didn't want to be against with Hightower, if he decided to serve as mayor again, anticipated on his friendship with Hightower.

In 2016, Burrell was succeeded by Samuel Jenkins Jr. for the 2nd district.

References 

Living people
Place of birth missing (living people)
Year of birth missing (living people)
Democratic Party members of the Louisiana House of Representatives
21st-century American politicians